María Cristina Lugones (January 26, 1944 – July 14, 2020) was an Argentine feminist philosopher, activist, and Professor of Comparative Literature and of women's studies at Carleton College in Northfield, MN and at Binghamton University in New York State. She identified as a U.S-based woman of color and theorized this category as a political identity forged through feminist coalitional work.

Lugones advanced Latino philosophy in theorizing various forms of resistance against multiple oppressions in Latin America, the US and elsewhere. She was known for her theory of multiple selves, her work on decolonial feminism, and for developing the concept of the "coloniality of gender," which posits that gender is a colonial imposition.

Education and career 
Lugones earned her BA from the University of California in 1969. She also received a master's degree in 1973 and a PhD in philosophy in 1978 from the University of Wisconsin. She taught Philosophy at Carleton College from 1972 to 1993, beginning as an instructor and leaving as a full professor.  She joined Binghamton University in 1993, where she was Professor of Comparative Literature and Women's Studies. During her time there, she taught in the Philosophy, Interpretation, and Culture program, the Latin American and Caribbean Area Studies Program, the Women, Gender, and Sexuality Studies Program, and the Department of Comparative Literature. She also held visiting appointments at ACM Chicago, Instituto Tilcara de la Universidad de Buenos Aires, Universidad Andina Simón Bolivar, and elsewhere. Her scholarship ranged across disciplines, extending from social and political philosophy to decolonial feminism, Andean philosophy, Latino politics and theories of resistance.

Lugones's work has been influenced by Gloria Anzaldúa, Combahee River Collective, Audre Lorde, Marilyn Frye, Kimberlé Crenshaw, Frantz Fanon, and Aníbal Quijano.

Outside of the academy, Lugones also worked as a popular educator. Inspired by the Highlander Folk School, in 1990 she co-founded La Escuela Popular Norteña in Valdez, New Mexico.

Research

Plurality 
Lugones is the author of Pilgrimages/Peregrinajes: Theorizing Coalition Against Multiple Oppressions (2003)  a seminal, highly praised collection of essays, many of which were originally published in Hypatia, Signs, and other journals. Among the essays included are "Playfulness, ‘World’‐Travelling, and Loving Perception," which addresses the experience of navigating hyphenated identities from a phenomenological perspective.  Lugones posits "a plurality of selves" that literally shift from being one person to being a different person, with each shift producing a corresponding new world. In another essay, "Purity, Impurity, and Separation," Lugones introduces the concept of curdling as an intersectional practice of resistance that works against an oppressive logic of purity.  Examples of curdling include: code-switching, drag, gender transgression and multilingual experimentation.

World travelling 
Lugones wrote an article called Playfulness, "World"-Travelling, and Loving Perception that uses her own method which she called "World Travelling" to understand how other individuals perceive us and themselves in their own world. Allowing us to travel to different worlds and comprehending others will permit us to start to love them through their own experience. By identifying with them people will began to understand who they are as an individual. Lugones explained the arrogant gaze is a technique many individuals have used to break their spirit to conquer their worlds; however, Lugones argues that loving perception is the response to the arrogant gaze that has us travel to other worlds.  

Lugones informed us that we can be at eased in different worlds by being able to speak the language of the world we enter, subjectively happy in a world where you are free to decide anything for yourself without any restriction, personal relation with people to create a bond, and sharing with one another an interest with a stranger that allows to relate with one another. However, having the sense of ease in a different world is not enough to understand an individual because you need more than easiness to love and identify with others. Lugones explained we need the attribute of playfulness to relate with others since it allows us to exist with an openness to accepting and creating new ideas without any rules or barriers to hinder us. Accordingly, the "loving perception" and the playfulness co-exist to love and understand one another who are different.

Coloniality of gender 

In her later work, "Heterosexualism and the Colonial/Modern Gender System" (2007) and "Toward a Decolonial Feminism" (2010), Lugones turns her attention to coloniality: its impact on gender formation, as well as various strategies of resistance which could contribute toward its eventual dismantling. Combining Anibal Quijano's theory of the coloniality of power with a feminist, intersectionalist framework, Lugones concludes that gender is a colonial imposition. Drawing on historical examples of pre-colonial, gynecratic Native American tribes, Lugones situates gender as a colonial classification system that divides and subjugates people differently depending on multiple intersectional factors including class and ethnicity.

Recognition and awards 
In 2016, she was named Distinguished Woman Philosopher by the Society for Women in Philosophy. In 2020, she was awarded the Frantz Fanon Lifetime Achievement Award from the Caribbean Philosophical Association in recognition of her contribution to decolonial philosophy/theory, feminist philosophy/theory, Indigenous philosophy/theory, critical gender, race and sexuality studies, Latin American philosophy and world systems theory.

Illness and death 
Lugones was diagnosed with her third occurrence of lung cancer in late 2019 and hospitalized with pneumonia-like symptoms after undergoing radiation treatment in 2020. On 14 July 2020, at 76 years of age, Lugones died at a hospital in Syracuse, New York. The cause was cardiac arrest.

Bibliography

Books

Papers & Essays

Further reading
Speaking Face to Face: The Visionary Philosophy of María Lugones (SUNY Series, Praxis: Theory in Action), ed. by Pedro J. DiPietro, Jennifer McWeeny, Shireen Roshanravan, State University of New York Press, 2019.

Editors’ Introduction: Tango Dancing with María Lugones: Toward Decolonial Feminisms of the Special Issue: Toward Decolonial Feminisms, Critical Philosophy of Race,Vol. 8, No. 1-2, 2020.

References

External links

 Maria Lugones, feminist philosopher who studied colonialism’s legacy, dies at 76, Obituary Washington Post.
 Maria Lugones, short introduction and links to articles at Global Social Theory.

1944 births
2020 deaths
Decolonial feminism
Feminist philosophers
Latin Americanists
Lesbian academics
Argentine lesbians
LGBT philosophers
Binghamton University faculty
Phenomenologists
People from Buenos Aires
Postcolonial theorists
University of California, Los Angeles alumni
University of Wisconsin–Madison alumni
Women's studies academics
Argentine women philosophers
20th-century Argentine philosophers
21st-century Argentine philosophers